Geranium endressii, commonly called Endres cranesbill or French crane's-bill, is a species of hardy flowering herbaceous or semi-evergreen perennial plant in the genus Geranium, family Geraniaceae.

It is native to the Western Pyrenees in Spain, and is cultivated as a garden subject. The leaves are deeply divided and the flowers are soft pink with red veins. It is very hardy, down to at least  and possibly less.

The cultivar ‘Castle Drogo’ has gained the Royal Horticultural Society's Award of Garden Merit.

References

External links 

endressii
Flora of France
Flora of the Pyrenees
Flora of Spain
Garden plants of Europe